Ian Herring (born 14 February 1984) is an English football player and manager, who plays as a midfielder. He was most recently player-manager of Hungerford Town.

Career
Herring made his debut for Swindon Town on 20 April 2002, at home to Wycombe Wanderers in the 1–1 draw coming on as a substitute in the 89th minute replacing Paul McAreavey in the last game of the 2001–02 season.

He joined Salisbury City from Chippenham Town in August 2007 to pursue full-time football. In 2009, he was released by Salisbury City who he spent three-years as a player at the club. In July, Herring joined Conference North team Northwich Victoria. Herring left Northwich at the end of the season.

Herring signed for Conference National side Forest Green Rovers in June 2010.

In February 2011 Swindon Town manager Danny Wilson expressed an interest in taking Herring back to his home club after some impressive performances at the heart of midfield for Forest Green Rovers.

Herring joined Conference South side Eastleigh on loan for a month in February 2011, playing in 5 league matches. The move was then made permanent in March 2011. Herring finished the season with 13 league appearances in total.

On 27 January 2012, following several new signings at Eastleigh, Herring joined previous club Chippenham Town on a month's loan.

Herring left Eastleigh at the end of the season and in July 2012 it was announced he had signed for Southern League South & West Division side Hungerford Town. In September 2017 he was appointed joint player/manager alongside Jon Boardman. Herring left Hungerford Town in April 2020.

References

External links

1984 births
Living people
English footballers
Swindon Town F.C. players
Salisbury City F.C. players
Chippenham Town F.C. players
Northwich Victoria F.C. players
Forest Green Rovers F.C. players
Eastleigh F.C. players
Hungerford Town F.C. players
English Football League players
National League (English football) players
English football managers
Hungerford Town F.C. managers
Association football midfielders